The yellow-crowned flowerpecker (Dicaeum anthonyi) is a species of bird in the family Dicaeidae. It is endemic to Luzon Island in the Philippines. The flame-crowned flowerpecker (Dicaeum kampalili), which is endemic to Mindanao, was formerly considered conspecific. Its natural habitat is tropical moist montane forest. It is becoming rare due to habitat loss.

Description and taxonomy 
EBird describes the bird as "A tiny bird of mossy montane forest and edge. Male has glossy black upperparts and pale underparts, whiter on the throat. Races differ. Luzon birds are yellow-orange under the base of the tail and on the crown. Similar to Bicolored flowerpecker, but male Flame-crowned has a bright crown patch and female has a yellowish belly. Voice includes a high-pitched descending whistle and a sharp "tsik!"

Exhibits sexual dimorphism in which males have the eponymous yellow crown and vent while females are much more dull and have uniform olive color and does not the black upperparts

It is seen feeding on flowering and fruiting trees.

Habitat and conservation status 
It inhabits tropic moist montane forest at 1,000-2,000 meters above sea level.

IUCN has assessed this bird as near threatened with its population being estimated as 10,000 to 19,999 mature individuals. Forest loss is a threat especially in its lower altitude limits which are more prone to legal and illegal logging, mining and conversion into farmland and road development. Extensive lowland deforestation has occurred on Mindoro. In the late 1980s, it was estimated that just 120 km2 of forest remained on Mindoro, with a very small proportion below 1,000 m and this figure still continues to decrease.

It is recommended to investigate potential threats and quantify more precisely the population size of the species. Protect areas of suitable habitat and safeguard against deforestation.

References

yellow-crowned flowerpecker
Endemic birds of the Philippines
yellow-crowned flowerpecker
Taxonomy articles created by Polbot
Birds of Luzon